The Battle of Livno is the name of several battles fought over the town of Livno during World War II, which changed hands between the Independent State of Croatia and Partisan forces several times.

Operation Beta
Operation Beta followed on the heels of Operation Alfa in which Italian forces retook Prozor from the Partisans. Ten Italian battalions and two Ustaše battalions took the city from the Partisans with neither side suffering many casualties.

Battle for Livno (late 1942)

The defence of the city was led by Rafael Boban and elements of his Black Legion. The battle resulted in Boban's forces retreating from Livno. Approximately 100 Croatian soldiers and 74 Partisan soldiers were killed in the battle.

Operation Ziethen

Operation Ziethen was a German-Croatian military operation which sought to reestablish control over the Livno–Šuica–Duvno area. The entire operation was a great success for the Axis forces. A mass grave containing over 1000 bodies of people executed by the Partisans was subsequently discovered near Livno. The success of the operation resulted in over 1000 volunteers from the area to join the Croatian forces.

Notes

References
Marijan, Davor, “Livno mora pasti”: borbe dijelova V. ustaškog stajaćeg zdruga s II. proleterskom divizijom za Livno u prosincu 1942. godine, Croatian Institute of History, 2008.

Livno
Livno
Livno
Livno, Battle of
Livno, Battle of
Livno
Livno, Battle of
1942 in Bosnia and Herzegovina
October 1942 events
Conflicts in 1942
History of Livno